Cerveza Norteña is a brand of beer started in Uruguay in 1948. The brand is produced by Fábricas Nacionales de Cerveza, a division of AB InBev,  the Belgian multinational drink and brewing company based in Leuven, Belgium. It is the most-consumed beer brand in Uruguay.  Due to the higher costs in Uruguay, the production of the beer has been shifted to Argentina.

References

External links
La espuma de los días: una historia reciente de las cervezas en Uruguay JG Lagos, La Diaria,  24  November 2020

Uruguayan alcoholic drinks
AB InBev
Multinational breweries
Beer in Argentina
Food and drink companies established in 1948